Ryan Hadison Cooley (born May 18, 1988) is a Canadian consultant and former actor. He is best known for his role as James Tiberius "J.T." Yorke on Degrassi: The Next Generation which he starred in from 2001 until 2007.  He also studied theatre at the University of Toronto.

Career
Prior to joining the Degrassi cast, he had a two-year run as Pleskit, the alien lead in the television series I Was a Sixth Grade Alien. Cooley's other television credits include the series, Are You Afraid of the Dark?, Queer as Folk, Lexx: The Series and Life with Derek. He has also appeared in the features Sachsenhausen 1944, Toy Men, Disney Channel movie The Color of Friendship, the Animal Planet movie Cybermutt and CBC TV movie Happy Christmas Miss King alongside his Degrassi co-star Lauren Collins. In 2006, Cooley was nominated for a Young Artist Award (LA) the category of Best Performance in a TV Comedy Series. Cooley has also appeared in the 2007 film The Tracey Fragments with Elliot Page. In 2012, Cooley guest starred in a YouTube  miniseries called Millie and Midge, in episodes 2 and 4 as Parker.

Cooley appeared on Degrassi: The Next Generation as a regular character in the first season of the show and continued his role until 2007, while the show was in its sixth season.

Filmography

Notes

References

External links

Cooley talks to theTVaddict.com

1988 births
Living people
Canadian people of Irish descent
20th-century Canadian male actors
21st-century Canadian male actors
Canadian male child actors
Canadian male film actors
Canadian male television actors
Canadian male voice actors
Male actors from Ontario
People from Orangeville, Ontario